Tresevern Croft is a hamlet west of Stithians, in west Cornwall, England, United Kingdom.

References

Hamlets in Cornwall